Liaquat Khan Khattak is a Pakistani politician who served as a member of the Provincial Assembly of Khyber Pakhtunkhwa from October 2018 to January 2023.

Political career
Khattak was elected to the Provincial Assembly of Khyber Pakhtunkhwa as a candidate of PTI from the constituency PK-64 in 2018 Pakistani by-elections held on 14 October 2018. He served as a Minister for Irrigation Department and Excise & Taxation Department Khyber Pakhtunkhwa until February 2021. He defeated Muhammad Shahid of Awami National Party (ANP). Khattak garnered 22,775 votes while his closest rival secured 9,560 votes. He was removed from the cabinet on 20 February 2020 on allegations that he supported Ikhtiar Wali Khan, Pakistan Muslim League (N)'s candidate, in the by-election for PK-63. Later, he resigned from PTI and joined JUI-F.

References

Living people
Jamiat Ulema-e-Islam (F) politicians
Politicians from Khyber Pakhtunkhwa
Year of birth missing (living people)